Raška architectural school, also known as the Raška style (Рашки стил, Raški stil), or simply as the Raška school, is an ecclesiastical architectural style that flourished in the Serbian High Middle Ages (ca. 1170–1300), during the reign of the Nemanjić dynasty. The style is present in the notable Morača Monastery, Uvac monastery and Dobrilovina monastery, among many others.  This style combines traditional Slavic architecture with early Christian church-design, and often utilizes a combination of stone and wood material.

Raška has the only extant significant, historical monument from the time of the acceptance of Christianity -- Church of the Holy Apostles Peter and Paul, Ras -- in Novi Pazar. Meanwhile, the other state, Zeta, had characteristics of the early Romanesque period, Latin in style. 

Towards the end of the 12th century, however, Stefan Nemanja united Raška and Duklja. When his young son Sava founded the independent church in 1219, all these cultural bridges connected Serbia to the best-known centers of world art, Salonika and Constantinople one the one side and Venice and the Adriatic coast on the other.

Examples
Rmanj Monastery, built by Katarina Branković, daughter of Serbian despot Đurađ Branković in 1443. 
Uvac Monastery, built by the Nemanjic dynasty in the 13th century
Gomionica monastery, built in the 15th century 
Kumanica monastery, built in the 15th century
Mala Remeta Monastery, built by King Dragutin in the 13th century. 
Dobrilovina Monastery, built before the 16th century
Monastery Moštanica, built by King Dragutin in the 13th century
Morača Monastery, built by Stefan Vukanović in 1252

See also
Serbian architectural styles
Architecture of Serbia
List of Serbian Orthodox monasteries

References

Sources

Byzantine architecture in Serbia
Medieval Serbian architecture
Kingdom of Serbia (medieval)
Serbian architectural styles
12th century in Serbia
13th century in Serbia
14th century in Serbia
Nemanjić dynasty
Serbian Orthodox Church
Serbian design